The Big Ten Athlete of the Year award is given annually to the top male and female collegiate athletes in the Big Ten Conference. It was first awarded in 1982, with winners being selected by a panel of conference media members from nominations submitted by each school.

History
In 1982, the Big Ten Conference established their athlete of the year award, with the winners being selected by a panel of conference media members from nominations submitted by each school. The award for male winners is named after Ohio State track star Jesse Owens. The woman's award was previously known as the Suzy Favor Athlete of the Year before it was revealed in 2012 that Favor had worked as a prostitute for a Las Vegas escort service. The Big Ten removed her name from the women's award in July 2013 as a result.

Winners

Male
Officially known as the Big Ten Jesse Owens Male Athlete of the Year award

Female

References

Big Ten Conference
College conference trophies and awards in the United States
Most valuable player awards
Awards established in 1982
Awards established in 1983
1982 establishments in the United States